Clarence E. Thorpe (November 5, 1909 – July 1985) was an American Negro league pitcher in the 1920s.

A native of Philadelphia, Pennsylvania, Thorpe attended Central High School, and played for the Hilldale Club in 1928. He died in Philadelphia in 1985 at age 75.

References

External links
Baseball statistics and player information from Baseball-Reference Black Baseball Stats and Seamheads

1909 births
1985 deaths
Date of death missing
Hilldale Club players
Baseball pitchers
Baseball players from Philadelphia
20th-century African-American sportspeople